"" (You, O beautiful building of the world) is a Lutheran hymn in German, with text by Johann Franck and melody by Johann Crüger. It was first published in Crüger's 1649 Geistliche Kirchen-Melodien, and was later adopted in other hymnals, such as the 1653 edition of his . The topic is renouncing the world, hoping to be united with Jesus. While the hymn is no longer in practical use, one stanza, "" (Come, O death, to sleep a brother), was prominently used in Bach's solo cantata Ich will den Kreuzstab gerne tragen, BWV 56; in English, it is commonly referred to as the "Kreuzstab cantata".

History 
The text, a reflection on the tribulations when facing death, was written by Johann Franck in eight stanzas. With a melody by Johann Crüger, the song appeared first in Crüger's hymnal Geistliche Kirchen-Melodien (Sacred church melodies) of 1649, with the incipit "Du geballtes Weltgebäude". It was included in his  in the 1653 edition. A 1864 anthology of sacred poetry from Martin Luther to Friedrich Gottlieb Klopstock contains seven stanzas. The hymn is no longer used.

Text 
The text opens with a stanza condemning and renouncing worldly pleasures, longing instead to be united with Jesus. Jesus is repeatedly addressed in the refrain of each final stanza, referring to Him as "Jesulein" (Little Jesus), with attributes such as "allerschönstes" (most beautiful) or "allerliebstes" (most beloved). More modern editions change the text, so that for example the last line of the first stanza becomes "lieber Herr und Heiland mein" (My dear Lord and Saviour). The first and the third stanzas of the English translation by Catherine Winkworth read:

According to the classical philologist Egert Pöhlmann, Franck's knowledge of classics was of help for the poetic imagery of the third stanza; here Pöhlmann finds echos of the profane ancient Greek and Latin poetry of Sappho and Horace.

A literal English translation of sixth stanza starts "Come, O death, you brother of sleep" – a century earlier in a paraphrase of the Nunc dimittis, Martin Luther wrote the hymn "Mit Fried und Freud ich fahr dahin" containing the verse "Der Tod ist mein Schlaf worden" (Death has become my sleep). For Franck's sixth stanza and the closing chorale of Bach's "Kreuzstab cantata", Death is addressed as a brother of sleep and asked to end the voyage of life by loosening the rudder of the pilgrim's boat or 'little ship' (Schifflein) and bringing it safely to harbour; it marks the end of the cantata's metaphorical journey. A metrical translation into English was provided by Henry Drinker. The current translation is  a minor variant:

Classical references to Death as the brother of Sleep, or as twins, go back to the Greek and Latin epics – the Iliad and the Aeneid – and the poetry of Hesiod, Virgil, Seneca and Valerius Flaccus; the metaphor of life as a journey dates back to classical times, and has been revisited in the Medieval, Renaissance, Baroque era and beyond; finally Franck's "sichern Port" echos Virgil's phrase beati portus from his early Catalepton.

In the seventh stanza, Franck calls the body, "the prison of the soul", an image that Pöhlmann remarks can be dated back to the Orpheus myth in Plato's Cratylus and Philolaos.

Melody and musical settings 
The melody by Johann Crüger, Zahn No. 6773, is in bar form.

Other hymns sung to the same melody include Paul Gerhardt's "Jesu, liebster Bruder", which addresses the "dearest Brother" as anchor and rudder ("Anker" and "Ruder"). It was printed by Zimmermann in 1821.

Johann Sebastian Bach composed a four-part chorale setting, BWV 301. He used the sixth stanza, "Komm, o Tod, du Schlafes Bruder" (Come, o Death, brother of sleep), for the closing chorale of his solo cantata for bass, Ich will den Kreuzstab gerne tragen, BWV 56.

Further settings of  "Du, o schönes Weltgebäude" include a cantata by Georg Telemann, TWV 1:394 and an instrumental chorale by Christoph Graupner GWV 1002:39. In addition there are settings for organ and obbligato instrument by Georg Friedrich Kauffmann in the collection Harmonische Seelenlust and by Gottfried August Homilius in the collection HoWV.X. There is further short organ chorale prelude composed by Dame Ethel Smythe in 1884 and published in 1913, as well as a setting by contemporary German composer Axel Ruoff, the latter recorded on a Toccata Classics CD.

Notes

References

Further reading 
 Johannes Kulp (ed. Arno Büchner and Siegfried Fornaçon): Die Lieder unserer Kirche. Eine Handreichung zum Evangelischen Kirchengesangbuch; Handbuch zum Evangelischen Kirchengesangbuch. Sonderband; Göttingen: Vandenhoeck & Ruprechjt 1958; pp. 245f.

External links 
 
 , sung by the Baroque Choral Guild, with the Arcadian Academy, directed by Nicholas McGegan
 Die Kantatentexte Benjamin Schmolcks (1672–1737). / Edition und Vertonungsgeschichte. stephan-aderhold.de
 Evangelisches Gesangbuch: nebst einem Anhange von Gebeten zur öffentlichen und häuslichen Gottesverehrung 1854
 Lorbeer, Lukas: Die Sterbe- und Ewigkeitslieder in deutschen lutherischen Gesangbüchern des 17. Jahrhunderts 2012 

17th-century hymns in German
Lutheran hymns
1649 works